Burushaski is a language isolate spoken by Burusho people, who reside almost entirely in northern Gilgit-Baltistan, Pakistan, with a few hundred speakers in northern Jammu and Kashmir, India. In Pakistan, Burushaski is spoken by people in Hunza District, Nagar District, northern Gilgit District, the Yasin valley in the Gupis-Yasin District and the Ishkoman valley of the northern Ghizer District. Their native region is located in northern Gilgit–Baltistan and borders with the Pamir corridor to the north. In India, Burushaski is spoken in Botraj Mohalla of the Hari Parbat region in Srinagar. It is generally believed that the language was spoken in a much wider area in the past. Burushaski place names are found in Northern Chitral as well as in the Kaghan valley.   Other names for the language are Biltum, Khajuna, Kunjut, Brushaski, Burucaki, Burucaski, Burushaki, Burushki, Brugaski, Brushas, Werchikwar and Miśa:ski.

Classification
Attempts have been made to establish links between Burushaski and several different language families, although none has been accepted by a majority of linguists.

Following Berger (1956), the American Heritage dictionaries suggested that the word *abel 'apple', the only name for a fruit (tree) reconstructed for Proto-Indo-European, may have been borrowed from a language ancestral to Burushaski. ("Apple" and "apple tree" are báalt in modern Burushaski.)

Other hypotheses posit a genealogical relationship between Burushaski and the North Caucasian languages, Kartvelian languages, Yeniseian languages and/or Indo-European languages, usually in proposed macrofamilies.
 The proposed but contended "Dené–Caucasian" macrofamily includes Burushaski as a primary branch alongside North Caucasian and Yeniseian.
 Another proposed family, known as "Karasuk", links Burushaski with Yeniseian.
The various proposals linking Burushaski to Indo-European make divergent—or in the case of Čašule even contradictory—claims about the nature of the relationship, and are rejected by mainstream scholarship.
 A possible connection specifically to the North Caucasian languages.

The linguist Sadaf Munshi stated that Burushaski may have developed alongside the Dravidian languages before the Indo-Aryan migration to South Asia, mentioning the fact that both possess retroflex sounds.

(Burushaski was not included in a 2008 study from Edward Vajda, to revive Merritt Ruhlen's proposed "Dené–Yeniseian macrofamily", which linked Yeniseian and Na-Dene. Vajda rejects any relation between Yeniseian and Burushaski.)

Varieties
Burushaski is spoken by about 120,000 speakers in Pakistan, and also by a few hundred in India. In Pakistan, it is spoken in three main valleys: Yasin, Hunza, and Nagar. The varieties of Hunza and Nagar diverge slightly, but are clearly dialects of a single language. The Yasin variety, also known by the Khowar exonym Werchikwar, is much more divergent. Intelligibility between Yasin and Hunza-Nagar is difficult, and Yasin is sometimes considered a distinct language and the pure Burushaski is spoken in Yasin valley. Yasin is the least affected by contact with neighboring languages, though speakers are bilingual in Khowar. Yasin is spoken by a quarter of Burushaski speakers.

In India, Jammu & Kashmir Burushaski (JKB) "has developed divergent linguistic features which make it systematically different from the varieties spoken in Pakistan." The dialect of Burushashki spoken in India has been influenced by Kashmiri, as well as Hindi and Urdu. Unique to JKB is the features of vowel syncopation. Jammu & Kashmir Burushaski shares more similarities with the dialect spoken in Nagar than with that spoken in Hunza.  The Srinagar variety of Burushaski has been known as low toned and is spoken a Kashmiri way of speaking the language.  The Srinagar variety of Burushaski has only 300 speakers.

Writing system

Burushaski is a predominantly spoken rather than written language. Occasionally the Urdu alphabet is used, and there are some specific characters in Unicode, but no fixed orthography exists. Adu Wazir Shafi wrote a book Burushaski Razon using a Latin script.

Tibetan sources record a Bru zha language of the Gilgit valley, which appears to have been Burushaski, whose script was one of five scripts used to write the extinct Zhang Zhung language. Although Burushaski may once have been a significant literary language, no Bru zha manuscripts are known to have survived. There is a very voluminous Buddhist tantra of the 'Ancient' (rNying ma) school of Tibetan Buddhism, preserved in Tibetan as the mDo dgongs 'dus, which has been the subject of numerous Tibetological publications, including a recent monograph by Jacob P. Dalton, The Gathering of Intentions, which is supposed to be translated from the Burushaski (bru zha'i skad). It contains words that are not Sanskrit but which, at this stage, it has not been ascertained whether they could actually be related to the Burushaski, or belong to another language (or, else, be purely "elfic"). If at least part of this text had actually been translated from Burushaski, it would make it one of the major monuments of an apparently lost literature.

Linguists working on Burushaski use various makeshift transcriptions based on the Latin alphabet, most commonly that by Berger (see below), in their publications.

Phonology 
Burushaski primarily has five vowels, /i e a o u/. Various contractions result in long vowels; stressed vowels (marked with acute accents in Berger's transcription) tend to be longer and less "open" than unstressed ones ( as opposed to ). Long vowels also occur in loans and in a few onomatopoeic words (Grune 1998). All vowels have nasal counterparts in Hunza (in some expressive words) and in Nager (also in proper names and a few other words).

Berger (1998) finds the following consonants to be phonemic, shown below in his transcription and in the IPA:

Notes:

Grammar
Burushaski is a double-marking language and word order is generally subject–object–verb.

Nouns in Burushaski are divided into four genders: human masculine, human feminine, countable objects, and uncountable ones (similar to mass nouns). The assignment of a noun to a particular gender is largely predictable. Some words can belong both to the countable and to the uncountable class, producing differences in meaning. For example, when countable, báalt means 'apple' but when uncountable, it means 'apple tree' (Grune 1998).

Noun morphology consists of the noun stem, a possessive prefix (mandatory for some nouns, and thus an example of inherent possession), and number and case suffixes. Distinctions in number are singular, plural, indefinite, and grouped. Cases include absolutive, ergative/oblique, genitive, and several locatives; the latter indicate both location and direction and may be compounded.

Burushaski verbs have three basic stems: past tense, present tense, and consecutive. The past stem is the citation form and is also used for imperatives and nominalization; the consecutive stem is similar to a past participle and is used for coordination. Agreement on the verb has both nominative and ergative features: transitive verbs and unaccusatives mark both the subject and the object of a clause, while unergatives verbs mark only subject agreement on the verb. Altogether, a verb can take up to four prefixes and six suffixes.

Nouns

Noun classes 
In Burushaski, there are four noun classes, similar to declensional classes in Indo-European languages, but unlike Indo-European, the nominal classes in Burushaski are associated with four grammatical "genders":
 m = male human beings, gods and spirits
 f = female human beings and spirits
 x = animals, countable nouns
 y = abstract concepts, fluids, uncountable nouns

Below, the abbreviation "h" will stand for the combination of the m- and f-classes, while "hx" will stand for the combination of the m-, f- and x-classes. Nouns in the x-class typically refer to countable, non-human beings or things, for example animals, fruit, stones, eggs, or coins; conversely, nouns in the y-class are as a rule uncountable abstractions or mass nouns, such as rice, fire, water, snow, wool, etc.

However, these rules are not universal – countable objects in the y-class are sometimes encountered, e.g. ha, 'house'. Related words can subtly change their meanings when used in different classes – for example, bayú, when a member of the x-class, means salt in clumps, but when in the y-class, it means powdered salt. Fruit trees are understood collectively and placed in the y-class, but their individual fruits belong to the x-class. Objects made of particular materials can belong to either the x- or the y- class: stone and wood are in the x-class, but metal and leather in the y-class. The article, adjectives, numerals and other attributes must be in agreement with the noun class of their subject.

Pluralisation 
There are two numbers in Burushaski: singular and plural. The singular is unmarked, while the plural is expressed by means of suffix, which vary depending on the class of the noun:
 h-class: possible suffixes 
 h- and x-class: possible suffixes 
 y-class: possible suffixes  (Nagar dialect)

Some nouns admit two or three different prefixes, while others have no distinctive suffix, and occur only in the plural, e.g. bras 'rice', gur 'wheat', bishké, 'fur', (cf. plurale tantum). On the other hand, there are also nouns which have identical forms in the singular and plural, e.g. hagúr 'horses'. Adjectives have a unique plural suffix, whose form depends on the class of the noun they modify, e.g. burúm 'white' gives the x-class plural burum-išo and the y-class plural burúm-ing.

Examples of pluralisation in Burushaski:
  (m), pl. wazíirishu 'vizier, minister'
  (m), pl. hiri 'man' (stress shifts)
  (f), pl. gushínga 'woman' (stress shifts)
  (f), pl. daseyoo 'girl', 'unmarried woman'
  (x), pl. huká 'dog'
  (x), pl. tilí 'walnut'
  (y), pl. theleng 'walnut tree'

Declension 
Burushaski is an ergative language. It has five primary cases.

The case suffixes are appended to the plural suffix, e.g. Huséiniukutse, 'the people of Hussein' (ergative plural). The genitive ending is irregular, /mo/, for singular f-class nouns, but /-e/ in all others (identical to the ergative ending). The dative ending, /-ar/, /-r/ is attached to the genitive ending for singular f-class nouns, but to the stem for all others. Examples:
 hir-e 'the man's', gus-mo 'the woman's' (gen.)
 hir-ar 'to the man', gus-mu-r 'to the woman' (dat.)

The genitive is placed before the thing possessed: Hunzue tham, 'the Emir of Hunza.'

The endings of the secondary cases are formed from a secondary case suffix (or infix) and one of the primary endings /-e/, /-ar/ or /-um/. These endings are directional, /-e/ being locative (answering 'where?'), /-ar/ being terminative (answering 'where to?'), and /-um/ being ablative (answering 'where from?'). The infixes, and their basic meanings, are as follows:

 -ts- 'at'
 -ul- 'in'
 -aṭ- 'on; with'
 -al- 'near' (only in the Hunza dialect)

From these, the following secondary or compound cases are formed:

The regular endings /-ul-e/ and /-ul-ar/ are archaic and are now replaced by /-ul-o/ and /-ar-ulo/ respectively.

Pronouns and pronominal prefixes 
Nouns indicating parts of the body and kinship terms are accompanied by an obligatory pronominal prefix. Thus, one cannot simply say 'mother' or 'arm' in Burushaski, but only 'my arm', 'your mother', 'his father', etc. For example, the root mi 'mother', is never found in isolation, instead one finds:
 i-mi 'his mother', mu-mi 'her mother', "gu-mi" 'your mother'(3f sg.), u-mi 'their mother' (3h pl.), u-mi-tsaro 'their mothers'(3h pl.).

The pronominal, or personal, prefixes agree with the person, number and – in the third person, the class of their noun. A summary of the basic forms is given in the following table:

Personal pronouns in Burushaski distinguish proximal and distal forms, e.g. khin 'he, this one here', but in, 'he, that one there'. In the oblique, there are additional abbreviated forms.

Numerals 
The Burushaski number system is vigesimal, i.e. based on the number 20. For example, 20 altar, 40 alto-altar (2 times 20), 60 iski-altar (3 times 20) etc. The base numerals are:
 1 han (or hen, hak)
 2 altó (or altán)
 3 isko (or iskey)
 4 wálto
 5 čindó
 6 mishíndo
 7 thaló
 8 altámbo
 9 hunchó
 10 tóorumo (also toorimi and turma)
 100 tha

Examples of compound numerals:

11 turma-han, 12 turma-alto, 13 turma-isko, ... , 19 turma-hunti;
20 altar, 30 altar-toorumo, 40 alto-altar, 50 alto-altar-toorumo, 60 iski-altar and so on;
21 altar-hak, 22 altar-alto, 23 altar-isko and so on.

Verbs

Overview
The verbal morphology of Burushaski is extremely complicated and rich in forms. Many sound changes can take place, including assimilation, deletion and accent shift, which are unique for almost every verb. Here, we can specify only certain basic principles.

The Burushaski finite verb falls into the following categories:

For many transitive verbs, in addition to the subject, the (direct) object is also indicated, also by pronominal prefixes which vary according to person, number and class. All verbs have negative forms, and many intransitive verbs also have derived transitive forms. The infinitive forms – which in Burushaski are the absolutives of the past and present, the perfect participle, and two infinitives – admit all the finite variations except tense and mood. Infinitive forms are made together with auxiliary verbs and periphrastic forms.

The 11 positions of the finite verb 
All verb forms can be constructed according to a complex but regular position system. Berger describes a total of 11 possible positions, or slots, although not all of these will be filled in any given verb form. Many positions also have several alternative contents (indicated by A/B/C below). The verb stem is in position 5, preceded by four possible prefixes and followed by seven possible suffixes. The following table gives an overview of the positions and their functions

Formation of tenses and moods 
The formation of the tenses and moods involves the use of several positions, or slots, in complicated ways. The preterite, perfect, pluperfect and conative are formed from the 'simple stem,' whereas the present, imperfect, future and conditional are formed from the 'present stem,' which is itself formed from the simple stem by placing -č- in position 7. The optative and imperative are derived directly from the stem. Altogether, the schema is as follows:

The formation of the tenses and moods of the verb her 'to cry', without prefixes:

Indication of the subject and object 
The subject and object of the verb are indicated by the use of personal prefixes and suffixes in positions 3, 8 and 10 as follows:

The personal prefixes are identical to the pronominal prefixes of nouns (mandatory with body parts and kinship terms, as above). A simplified overview of the forms of the affixes is given in the following table:

For example, the construction of the preterite of the transitive verb phus 'to tie', with prefixes and suffixes separated by hyphens, is as follows :
 i-phus-i-m-i "he ties him" (filled positions: 3-5-8-9-10)
 mu-phus-i-m-i "he ties her (f)"
 u-phus-i-m-i "he ties them (pl. hx)"
 mi-phus-i-m-i "he ties us"
 i-phus-i-m-an "we/you/they tie him"
 mi-phus-i-m-an "you/they tie us"
 i-phus-i-m-a "I tie it"
 gu-phus-i-m-a "I tie you"

The personal affixes are also used when the noun occupies the role of the subject or the object, e.g. hir i-ír-i-mi 'the man died'. With intransitive verbs, the subject function is indicated by both a prefix and a suffix, as in:
 gu-ir-č-u-m-a "you will die" (future)
 i-ghurts-i-m-i "he sank" (preterite)

Personal prefixes do not occur in all verbs and all tenses. Some verbs do not admit personal prefixes, others still do so only under certain circumstances. Personal prefixes used with intransitive verbs often express a volitional function, with prefixed forms indicating an action contrary to the intention of the subject. For example:
 hurúṭ-i-m-i "he sat down" (volitional action without prefix)
 i-ír-i-m-i "he died" (involuntary action with prefix)
 ghurts-i-mi "he went willingly underwater", "he dove" (without prefix)
 i-ghurts-i-m-i "he went unwillingly underwater", "he sank" (with prefix)

The d- prefix 
A number of verbs – mostly according to their root form – are found with the d-prefix in position 2, which occurs before a consonant according to vowel harmony. The precise semantic function of the d-prefix is unclear. With primary transitive verbs the d-prefix, always without personal prefixes, forms regular intransitives. Examples:
 i-phalt-i-mi 'he breaks it open' (transitive)
 du-phalt-as 'to break open, to explode' (intransitive)

A master's thesis research work of a native speaker of Burushaski on Middle Voice Construction in the Hunza Dialect claims that the [dd-] verbal prefix is an overt morphological middle marker for MV constructions, while the [n-] verbal prefix is a morphological marker for passive voice. The data primarily come from the Hunza dialect of Burushaski, but analogous phenomena can be observed in other dialects. This research is based on a corpus of 120 dd-prefix verbs. This research has showed that position {-2} on the verb template is occupied by voice-marker in Burushaski. The author argues that the middle marker is a semantic category of its own and that it is clearly distinguished from the reflexive marker in this language. The middle marker (MM) means the grammatical device used to "indicate that the two semantic roles of Initiator and Endpoint refer to a single holistic entity" (Kemmer 1993: 47). In the view of that definition, I look at a middle marked verb in Burushaski and illustration follows the example. 
 hiles dd-i-il-imi 'the boy drenched'

See also
 Burushaski comparative vocabulary list (Wiktionary)
 Partawi Shah
 Languages of Pakistan

References

Bibliography
 Anderson, Gregory D. S. 1997. Burushaski Morphology. In Morphologies of Asia and Africa, ed. by Alan Kaye. Winona Lake, IN: Eisenbrauns.
 Anderson, Gregory D. S. 1997. Burushaski Phonology. In Phonologies of Asia and Africa, ed. by Alan Kaye. Winona Lake, IN: Eisenbrauns.
 Anderson, Gregory D. S. 1999. M. Witzel's "South Asian Substrate Languages" from a Burushaski Perspective. Mother Tongue (Special Issue, October 1999).
 Anderson, Gregory D. S. forthcoming b. Burushaski. In Language Islands: Isolates and Microfamilies of Eurasia, ed. by D.A. Abondolo. London: Curzon Press.
 Backstrom, Peter C. Burushaski in Backstrom and Radloff (eds.), Languages of northern areas, Sociolinguistic Survey of Northern Pakistan, 2. Islamabad, National Institute of Pakistan Studies, Qaid-i-Azam University and Summer Institute of Linguistics (1992), 31–54.
 Berger, Hermann. 1974. Das Yasin-Burushaski (Werchikwar). Volume 3 of Neuindische Studien, ed. by Hermann Berger, Lothar Lutze and Günther Sontheimer. Wiesbaden: Otto Harrassowitz.
 Berger, Hermann. 1998. Die Burushaski-Sprache von Hunza und Nager [The B. language of H. and N.]. Three volumes: Grammatik [grammar], Texte mit Übersetzungen [texts with translations], Wörterbuch [dictionary]. Altogether Volume 13 of Neuindische Studien (ed. by Hermann Berger, Heidrun Brückner and Lothar Lutze). Wiesbaden: Otto Harassowitz.
 Grune, Dick. 1998. Burushaski – An Extraordinary Language in the Karakoram Mountains.
 
 Karim, Piar. 2013. Middle Voice Construction in Burushaski: From the Perspective of a Native Speaker of the Hunza Dialect. Unpublished MA Thesis. Denton: University of North Texas. Department of Linguistics.
 Morgenstierne, Georg. 1945. Notes on Burushaski Phonology. Norsk Tidsskrift for Sprogvidenskap 13: 61–95.
 Lorimer, D. L. R. 1937. Burushaski and its Alien Neighbours .
 Munshi, Sadaf. 2006. Jammu and Kashmir Burushaski: Language, language contact, and change. Unpublished Ph.D. Dissertation. Austin: University of Texas at Austin, Department of Linguistics.
 Munshi, Sadaf. 2010. "Contact-induced language change in a trilingual context: the case of Burushaski in Srinagar". In Diachronica. John Benjamins Publishing Company. 27.1: pp32–72.

Further reading

 Bashir, Elena. 2000. A Thematic Survey of Burushaski Research. History of Language 6.1: 1–14.
 Berger, Hermann. 1956. Mittelmeerische Kulturpflanzennamen aus dem Burušaski [Names of Mediterranean cultured plants from B.]. Münchener Studien zur Sprachwissenschaft 9: 4-33.
 Berger, Hermann. 1959. Die Burušaski-Lehnwörter in der Zigeunersprache [The B. loanwords in the Gypsy language]. Indo-Iranian Journal 3.1: 17–43.
 Casule Ilija. 2016. Evidence for the Indo-European and Balkan Origin of Burushaski.München: Lincom GmbH. 205 p.Lincom Etymological Studies 05.
 Casule, Ilija. 2017. Burushaski etymological dictionary of the inherited Indo-European lexicon. München: Lincom GmbH. 325 p. (LINCOM Etymological Studies; no. 6)
 Casule, Ilija. 2018, New Burushaski etymologies and the origin of the ethnonym Burúśo, Burúśaski, Brugaski and Miśáski. Acta Orientalia. Vol. 79: 27–71.
 Lorimer, D. L. R. 1935–1938. The Burushaski Language (3 vols.). Oslo: Instituttet for Sammenlignende Kulturforskning.
 Munshi, Sadaf. 2016. Burushaski Language Resource. A digital collection of Burushaski oral literature available at URL: https://digital.library.unt.edu/explore/collections/BURUS/
 van Skyhawk, Hugh. 1996. Libi Kisar. Ein Volksepos im Burushaski von Nager. Asiatische Studien 133. .
 van Skyhawk, Hugh. 2003. Burushaski-Texte aus Hispar. Materialien zum Verständnis einer archaischen Bergkultur in Nordpakistan. Beiträge zur Indologie 38. .
 Tiffou, Étienne. 1993. Hunza Proverbs. University of Calgary Press. 
 Tiffou, Étienne. 1999. Parlons Bourouchaski. Paris: L'Harmattan. 
 Tiffou, Étienne. 2000. Current Research in Burushaski: A Survey. History of Language 6(1): 15–20.
 Tikkanen, Bertil. 1988. On Burushaski and other ancient substrata in northwest South Asia. Studia Orientalia 64: 303–325.
 Varma, Siddheshwar. 1941. Studies in Burushaski Dialectology. Journal of the Royal Asiatic Society of Bengal, Letters 7: 133–173.

External links

 Burushaski Language Documentation Project
 Burushaski basic lexicon at the Global Lexicostatistical Database
 Noboru. 2012. A reference grammar of Eastern Burushaski.
 Jammu and Kashmir Burushaski: Language, Language contact and change

 
Language isolates of Asia
Languages of Pakistan
Languages of Gilgit-Baltistan
Languages of Jammu and Kashmir
Endangered languages of India 
Hunza
Burusho people
Subject–object–verb languages